This is a list of museums in the Solomon Islands:

 Solomon Islands National Museum
 Vilu Military Museum
 Peter Joseph WW2 Museum
 Willie Besi War Museum

Museums
Solomon Islands
Solomon Islands
Museums
Museums

Museums